Georgi Valchev (Bulgarian: Георги Вълчев; born 5 February 2000) is a Bulgarian footballer who plays as a defender for Dunav Ruse. His twin brother, Stanislav, is also a footballer playing for Ludogorets Razgrad.

Career

Ludogorets Razgrad
Valchev made his professional debut for the first team on 20 May 2018 in a league match against Botev Plovdiv. On 30 May he and his brother signed their first professional contracts with Ludogorets.

Career statistics

Club

References

2000 births
Living people
Bulgarian footballers
Bulgaria youth international footballers
PFC Ludogorets Razgrad players
PFC Ludogorets Razgrad II players
First Professional Football League (Bulgaria) players
Second Professional Football League (Bulgaria) players
Association football defenders